Lynda Mendelson (also known as Linda Mendelson; born January 6, 1961) is an American former child actress noted for providing the voice of Frieda in several Peanuts animated films during the late 1960s and the early 1970s.

Later in life she has worked behind the scenes in various capacities within the film production industry. Mendelson is the daughter of Lee Mendelson.

Vocal roles
A Boy Named Charlie Brown (film musical - 1969)
Play It Again, Charlie Brown  (TV special - 1971)
Snoopy, Come Home (film musical - 1972)

References

External links
 

Living people
American child actresses
American voice actresses
21st-century American women
1961 births